Anaheim University is a private for-profit university based in Anaheim, California. It was founded in 1996 as the Newport Asia Pacific University.

The university is accredited by the Distance Education Accrediting Commission (DEAC). Anaheim University claims to be one of the first online universities in the United States to offer graduate degree programs entirely online. The university is made up of three graduate schools and is best known for its online degree and certificate programs in TESOL (Teaching English to Speakers of Other Languages).

Graduate School of Education
The Anaheim University Graduate School of Education is the first graduate school within the university. It claims to be one of the first graduate schools in the United States to offer an online master's degree program taught almost entirely online through real-time synchronous study. Within the Anaheim University Graduate School of Education is the Anaheim University David Nunan TESOL Institute, a division of the school offering certificate and undergraduate diploma programs in TESOL and Teaching English to Young Learners.

Akio Morita School of Business
The Akio Morita School of Business is Anaheim University's Business School. It was named in honor of Sony founder Akio Morita (1921–1999).

Kisho Kurokawa Green Institute
The Anaheim University Kisho Kurokawa Green Institute was conceived by the eco-minded architect Kisho Kurokawa who prior to his death in October 2007 was Chair of the Executive Advisory Board at Anaheim University.

Carland Entrepreneurship Institute
The Anaheim University Carland Entrepreneurship Institute is named in honor of its founders, Professors JoAnn and Jim Carland, two of the most frequently cited authors in the academic field of entrepreneurship. They have over thirty years experience as university faculty members and helped to pioneer the academic field of entrepreneurship by developing the first Master of Entrepreneurship program in the United States in 2003.

Akira Kurosawa School of Film
The Akira Kurosawa School of Film is the university's Film School, located in Anaheim, California and named in honor of the Japanese Film Director Akira Kurosawa. The school is primarily an online film school; although its headquarters are in Anaheim, California it also has a learning center in Tokyo, Japan.  It was established on March 23, 2009, during a tribute to celebrate the 99th anniversary of Kurosawa's birth.

Carrie Hamilton Entertainment Institute 
The Carrie Hamilton Entertainment Institute is a unit of Anaheim University established in 2010 which plans to offer online entertainment-related programs. It was established with a donation from Emmy Award-winning actress and comedian Carol Burnett in memory of Burnett's daughter, actress Carrie Hamilton.

Locations
The university's headquarters and digital film studios/publishing division "Anaheim University Press" are located in Anaheim, California, United States. The Anaheim University Akio Morita Learning Center was located on the former estate of Sony Founder Akio Morita in the Minami Aoyama district of Minato, Tokyo, Japan.

See also

References

External links
Anaheim University

 
Education in Anaheim, California
Universities and colleges in Orange County, California
Educational institutions established in 1996
Private universities and colleges in California
1996 establishments in California
Distance Education Accreditation Commission